See Bill S. Ballinger for the author and screenwriter

William George Ballinger (born December 17, 1945) is a former politician in Ontario, Canada. He was a Liberal member of the Legislative Assembly of Ontario from 1987 to 1990 who represented the GTA riding of Durham—York.

Background
Ballinger was educated at the University of Waterloo and Toronto Teacher's College. He owns and operates Artforms, in Uxbridge, Ont.

Politics
He served as mayor, councillor and regional councillor in Uxbridge, Ontario.

He was elected to the Ontario legislature in the 1987 provincial election, defeating Progressive Conservative incumbent Ross Stevenson by 482 votes.  He served as parliamentary assistant to the Minister of Municipal Affairs from 1988 to 1989.

The Liberals were defeated by the Ontario New Democratic Party in the 1990 provincial election, and Ballinger lost his seat to NDP candidate Larry O'Connor by 1,230 votes.

See also
 List of University of Waterloo people

References

External links
 

1945 births
Living people
Mayors of places in Ontario
Ontario Liberal Party MPPs
People from Uxbridge, Ontario
People from Whitchurch-Stouffville
Politicians from Toronto
University of Waterloo alumni